The Brown–Forman Corporation is an American company, one of the largest in the spirits and wine business. Based in Louisville, Kentucky, it manufactures several well known brands throughout the world, including Jack Daniel's, Old Forester, Woodford Reserve, GlenDronach, BenRiach, Glenglassaugh, Finlandia, Herradura, Korbel, and Chambord. Brown–Forman formerly owned Southern Comfort and Tuaca before selling them off in 2016.

As of fiscal 2016 the company had sales of $3.08 billion. The roughly 40 members of the Brown family, cousins that are descendants of founder George Garvin Brown, control more than 70% of the voting shares and in 2016 had a net worth of $12.3 billion.

History 

The company was founded in 1870 by George Garvin Brown, a young pharmaceuticals salesman in Louisville, who had the then-novel idea of selling top-grade whiskey in sealed glass bottles.

In 1890, the organisation's name was changed to Brown–Forman and Company in order to reflect the partnership. Despite the prohibitionist movement in America, the company prospered.

George Forman died in 1901, and Brown purchased his stock. Shortly after this, Brown–Forman was incorporated.

In 1904, Owsley Brown, George Garvin Brown's son, came into the business. When George Garvin Brown died at the age of 70 in 1917, his son, Owsley, took over as president of Brown–Forman.

With the onset of Prohibition in the United States, Brown–Forman was granted one of six national licenses to produce medicinal whiskey.

In 2005, the company sold its Lenox division (one of the oldest and most famous manufacturers of fine china in the United States), which had been acquired in 1983, to Department 56 for $160 million. The income generated by the sale was distributed to the shareholders in the form of a one time special dividend.

In 2006, the company acquired the Chambord liqueur brand (a super-premium black raspberry liqueur produced in France) for $255 million.

In 2007, the company acquired Tequila Herradura, a Mexican company that produces the Casa Herradura tequila brand (a super-premium tequila produced in Mexico) for $776 million, while it also sold its Hartman Luggage division (one of the leaders in the travel goods industry and originally a subdivision of Lenox), to Clarion Capitol Partners. One year later, it sold the Bolla and Fontana Candida Italian wine brands to Gruppo Italiano Vini (GIV). The terms of neither sale were disclosed.

In 2011, the company sold Fetzer Vineyards and associated brands to Chilean wine producer Viña Concha y Toro S.A. for $238 million.

In 2016, the Southern Comfort and Tuaca brands were sold to Sazerac Company for $543 Million.

In 2016, Brown–Forman also reached an agreement to purchase The BenRiach Distillery Company Limited for approximately £285 million. The purchase brought GlenDronach, BenRiach, and Glenglassaugh to Brown–Forman's portfolio.

In 2020, the company sold the Early Times and Canadian Mist brands to Sazerac Company.

The company is a sponsor of the Brown–Forman Retailer of the Year awards given by the American Beverage Licensees.

Stocks 
Brown–Forman has two classes of common stock, both of which are traded publicly on the New York Stock Exchange. The Class A shares carry voting privileges and are thinly traded due to control by the Brown family while the Class B shares are non-voting stock.

Brands

American whiskey 
 Old Forester Kentucky straight bourbon whiskey (the first bottled bourbon brand sold exclusively in sealed bottles and the oldest bourbon continuously on the market – first bottled in 1870)
 Woodford Reserve Kentucky straight bourbon whiskey
 Jack Daniel's Tennessee whiskey

Canadian whisky 
 Collingwood, blended Canadian whisky

Scotch whisky 
 BenRiach, single malt Scotch whisky
 GlenDronach, single malt Scotch whisky
 Glenglassaugh, single malt Scotch whisky

Wine 
 Korbel, sparkling wine (distributed)
 Sonoma-Cutrer Wines

Vodka 
 Finlandia
 Maximus vodka (discontinued)

Gin 
Fords Gin

Tequila 
 Don Eduardo
 El Jimador
 Herradura
 Pepe Lopez

Liqueur 
 Chambord raspberry liqueur

Ready-to-drink coolers 
 Little Black Dress

Environmental impact 
In 2009, Newsweek magazine ranked Brown–Forman in their "Green Rankings" which examines 500 of the largest corporations on their environmental track record.  Brown–Forman was ranked 63rd out of 500 overall, and was ranked third in the food and beverage industry sector.

Controversies

Illegal subsidization in China 
In 2011, Brown–Forman was accused of illegally subsidizing its distributors in China, and subsequently delaying payment to them as agreed under contract. The Shanghai Administration for Industry and Commerce fined Brown–Forman 2 million renminbi (US$320,000) for illegal subsidization.

See also 
 List of major employers in Louisville, Kentucky
 List of historic whisky distilleries

References

External links 

 
Manufacturing companies based in Louisville, Kentucky
Companies listed on the New York Stock Exchange
Food and drink companies established in 1870
Wine companies
Distilleries in Kentucky
Drink companies of the United States
1870 establishments in Kentucky
American companies established in 1870
Food and drink companies based in Kentucky